Jerry Meyers (born March 8, 1965) is an American college baseball coach and former pitcher, who is the current head coach for the Middle Tennessee Blue Raiders. 

Meyers attended the Iowa State University from 1984-1987 before starting his coaching career as a graduate assistant at South Alabama. Later he was an assistant coach at Gulf Coast Community College, UNC-Wilmington, and Old Dominion. Prior to the 1996 season he joined the coaching staff at  University of South Carolina as the pitching coach the under Ray Tanner.

Old Dominion
Meyers spent eight seasons at South Carolina before being named the head baseball coach at Old Dominion University after the 2004 college baseball succeeding Tony Guzzo. During his time at ODU Meyers compiled an overall record of 167-158 in six seasons. He was named the 2006 CAA Coach of the Year and in 2008 he was the pitching coach for Team USA.

Second stint at South Carolina
After six seasons Meyers left Old Dominion for USC in 2010 where he now coaches pitchers again. 

Jerry Meyers coached some of the best college pitchers at South Carolina, including 2000 Golden Spikes Award winner Kip Bouknight. One common theme for the successful Gamecock pitching staffs under his leadership was the presence of a dominating closer.

Two of these closers rank in the top 10 all-time in single season saves, with one more being in the top 15.

Personal
Meyers and his wife Christina have two daughters, Jaye Riley and Audrey Reese.

Head coaching record

References

External links
 Middle Tennessee profile

1965 births
Living people
Iowa State Cyclones baseball players
Gulf Coast State Commodores baseball coaches
UNC Wilmington Seahawks baseball coaches
Old Dominion Monarchs baseball coaches
South Carolina Gamecocks baseball coaches
Middle Tennessee Blue Raiders baseball coaches